National Highway 49 (combination of old NH 6 and NH 200) is a primary National Highway in India. This highway runs from Bilaspur in the Indian state of Chhattisgarh to Kharagpur in West Bengal. Starting from NH 130 near Bilaspur, it terminates at NH 16 near Kharagpur, West Bengal. The highway is part of AH46 network in India.

Route 

NH49 transits through the Chhattishgarh, Odisha, Jharkhand and West Bengal, four states of India.
Chhattisgarh
Bilaspur, Saragaon, Sakti, Raigarh
Odisha
Kanaktora, Jharsuguda, Kuchinda, Pravasuni, Deogarh, Barakot, Pal Laharha, Kendujhargarh, Turumunga, Chadheibhol, Jashipur, Bangriposhi
Jharkhand
Baharagora
West Bengal
Kharagpur

Junctions  
 
  Terminal near Bilaspur.
  near Saragaon 
  near Raigarh
  near Debagarh
  near Barkote
  near Pallahara
  near Kendujhar
  near Jashipur
  near Baharagora
  near Kharagpur
  Terminal near Kharagpur.

See also 
 List of National Highways in India (by Highway Number)
 List of National Highways in India
 National Highways Development Project

References

External links
 NH 49 on OpenStreetMap

National highways in India
National Highways in Chhattisgarh
National Highways in Odisha
National Highways in Jharkhand
National Highways in West Bengal
Transport in Bilaspur, Chhattisgarh
Transport in Kharagpur